Socialwok was a business social networking service launched in September 2009. Socialwok integrates with Google Apps and Google accounts. The service provides a feed-based format for users to share ideas, files, documents and calendars using rich media status updates. According to the homepage, the service was shut down on July 12, 2011.

History 

On September 10, 2009, Socialwok won the TechCrunch50 Demopit award. It was the first Singapore-based company to do so. Five days later, on September 15, 2009, the service launched at the TechCrunch50 conference.

Service 
Socialwok is built on Google App Engine, Google's cloud computing service.

References

External links 
 Socialwok

Singaporean social networking websites